Odontamblyopus rubicundus is a species of eel goby native to coastal waters and estuaries from the east coast of India to Myanmar and Bangladesh.  This species can reach a length of  TL.  It is of minor importance to local commercial fisheries.

Habitats
This species found on freshwater and estuary in Bangladesh.They also found in Dakatia river  and the Sundarbans of Bangladesh.

References

Amblyopinae
Fish described in 1822